Glenn Scott (born 29 October 1966) is a British cross-country skier. He competed in the men's 10 kilometre classical event at the 1992 Winter Olympics.

References

External links
 

1966 births
Living people
British male cross-country skiers
Olympic cross-country skiers of Great Britain
Cross-country skiers at the 1992 Winter Olympics
Sportspeople from Luton